Peckwell is a surname. Notable people with the surname include:

 Henry Peckwell (1747–1787), Church of England cleric of Methodist views
 H. W. Peckwell (1852–1936), American artist
 Robert Henry Peckwell, later Robert Henry Blosset (1776–1823), English lawyer and Chief Justice of Bengal